Casey Jon Deidrick (born April 25, 1987) is an American actor and singer. Deidrick is best known for originating the role of Chad DiMera on the NBC soap opera Days of Our Lives.

Personal life
Deidrick was born in Santa Clara, California to parents Barry Jon Deidrick, an IBEW 332 Union electrician, and Denise Deck, a nurse. At the age of 3 years old, his parents divorced. When Deidrick was 7 years old, his mother moved to Arizona and Deidrick resided with his father in Hollister, California. He later took up skateboarding. After his first year in high school, Deidrick moved to Highlands Ranch, Colorado with his mother. Deidrick continued skateboarding and was eventually sponsored. In 2004, Deidrick competed in the Vans World Amateur Competition. He was also featured in a photo-spread for Transworld Skateboarding. Deidrick was commonly injured during his skateboarding career. However, one accident left him with a severe concussion; and Deidrick decided to give up skateboarding to focus on acting. Deidrick has four younger half-siblings; Amy and Jake from his father and stepmother, and two half-sisters, Micayla and Nikole from his mother and stepfather. Deidrick attended Metropolitan State College in Denver for a year where he majored in theater and psychology. In 2012, Deidrick adopted a Siberian husky dog which he named Nanuk. Deidrick was also the Unclean Vocalist in the heavy metal band called And Still I Rise.

Career
Deidrick had his first experience as an actor in high school when he and a friend auditioned for the school's production of Carousel with a rock song. Deidrick attended the AMTC (Actors, Models & Talent Competition) Convention in Orlando, Florida, where he met his agent. Deidrick made the decision to go into acting at the age of 15 when he saw The Lord of the Rings for the first time. At the age of 19, Deidrick relocated to Los Angeles to pursue his acting career. He found a manager and enrolled in acting classes. Deidrick supported himself working as a waiter and eventually booked guest spots on Wizards of Waverly Place and 90210 before booking Days. In February 2012, Deidrick made a guest appearance on the ABC prime time series Body of Proof. In April 2013, Deidrick made guest appearances on Glee and NBC's Revolution. On June 20, 2013, Deidrick announced his departure from Days of our Lives on his Twitter account. Deidrick's last appearance on Days was on October 30, 2013.

In September 2014, Deidrick was cast in MTV's thriller series Eye Candy. He played the main role of Tommy, a detective, who worked with Lindy (Victoria Justice). The series is about a genius who realizes that her online suitor is a dangerous cyber stalker. The show was cancelled after one season. In November 2016, Casey appeared in The Chainsmokers' music video for the song "All We Know."

On July 7, 2017, Deidrick had been cast on the MTV teen drama series Teen Wolf where he portrayed Halwyn, a former resident of Eichen House who also happens to be a hundred-year-old Hellhound with mysterious ties to an ancient evil now threatening Beacon Hills in the aftermath of the Ghost Riders and the Wild Hunt.

In 2020, Deidrick starred in the feature psychological thriller film Painter.

In February 2021, Deidrick starred in a feature-length episode of the horror TV anthology Into the Dark titled "Tentacles" as Sam Anselm. In December of the same year, he was cast alongside Emily Osment in Hallmark’s A Very Merry Bridesmaid.

From 2019-2022, Deidrick starred in In The Dark. He played Max Parish, a food truck owner and associate of Darnell who becomes attracted to Murphy.

Filmography

Film

Television

Music videos

References

External links

Living people
1987 births
People from Santa Clara, California
American male soap opera actors
21st-century American male actors
American male television actors
People from Highlands Ranch, Colorado